Fathering may refer to:
 the male act of begetting a child
 the practice of fatherhood and nurture of a child
 Fathering (journal), an academic publication

See also 
 Father (disambiguation)